The Making Scenes Film and Video Festival was an annual film festival in Ottawa, Ontario, Canada, active from 1992 to 2005. The festival programmed an annual lineup of LGBT film, alongside other arts and cultural events.

The event was created in 1992 by a small group of gay and lesbian film buffs after attending Toronto's inaugural Inside Out Film and Video Festival in 1991. Its launch saw some minor controversy over the city's approval of a municipal arts grant to the organizing committee, which some critics tried to connect to the city's denial of a grant to the long-running Kiwanis Music Festival. In its first two years the event was staged in the Alumni Auditorium at the University of Ottawa, while in 1994 it moved to the auditorium of the National Gallery of Canada. It later moved to other venues, including the World Exchange Plaza and the ByTowne Cinema.

In 1999 the festival staged a special preview screening of Thom Fitzgerald's film Beefcake, which had already screened at a couple of film festivals in the United States but had not yet opened theatrically in Canada, as a fundraiser several months before the regular festival.

The festival ended operations in 2005. In its place, Inside Out launched an Ottawa edition in 2007.

References

LGBT film festivals in Canada
Film festivals in Ottawa
Film festivals established in 1992
1992 establishments in Ontario
2005 disestablishments in Ontario
LGBT culture in Ottawa
Defunct film festivals in Canada